Mario Pretto (7 October 1915 – 2 April 1984) was an Italian footballer turned coach who managed Bolivia in the 1950 FIFA World Cup. As a player, he played as a defender and spent his entire career with Napoli.

References

1915 births
1984 deaths
Italian footballers
S.S.C. Napoli players
Serie A players
Italian football managers
Italian expatriate football managers
Association football defenders
1950 FIFA World Cup managers
Bolivia national football team managers
Expatriate football managers in Bolivia
Audax Italiano managers
Expatriate football managers in Chile
People from Schio
Sportspeople from the Province of Vicenza
Footballers from Veneto